Whitechapel is a British police procedural, produced by Carnival Films and distributed by BBC Worldwide, in which detectives in London's Whitechapel district deal with murders which replicated historical crimes. The first series was broadcast in the UK on 2 February 2009 and depicted the search for a modern copycat killer replicating the murders of Jack the Ripper.

A second series was commissioned by ITV in September 2009 with the focus on the Kray twins. The first episode of this second series was broadcast on 11 October 2010.

A third series was commissioned by ITV in March 2011, which was extended to six episodes as three two-part stories.

The first and second series were broadcast in the United States on six consecutive Wednesday evenings beginning 26 October 2011 on the BBC America cable network. The third was broadcast in the US starting on Wednesday 28 March 2012, also on BBC America.

On 24 September 2012, ITV renewed Whitechapel for a fourth and final series consisting of six episodes. The first episode was broadcast on 4 September 2013.

On 16 November 2013, lead actor Rupert Penry-Jones confirmed that ITV had decided not to recommission the show.

Main cast

 Rupert Penry-Jones as D.I. Joseph Chandler
 Phil Davis as D.S. Ray Miles
 Steve Pemberton as Edward Buchan
 Christopher Fulford as D.C. Fitzgerald (Series 1)
 Johnny Harris as D.C. Sanders (Series 1)
 Sam Stockman as D.C. Emerson Kent
 George Rossi as D.C. John McCormack (Series 1–2)
 Alex Jennings as Commander Anderson (Series 1–2)
 Claire Rushbrook as Dr Caroline Llewellyn
 Ben Bishop as D.C. Finlay Mansell (Series 2–4)
 Hannah Walters as D.C. Megan Riley (Series 3–4)

Connections to the Whitechapel murders case
The names of the some of the characters are drawn from real people associated with the Whitechapel murders case committed by Jack the Ripper. Joseph Chandler was a Police Inspector who was the first officer to arrive at the scene of the death of Annie Chapman. Edward Buchan was a contemporary suspect for the murders who committed suicide on the day of Mary Jane Kelly's funeral. Mary Bousfield was Martha Tabram's landlady. John McCormack was the lover of suspected ripper victim Alice McKenzie.
A Dr Llewellyn was called to the scene of the murder of Mary Ann Nichols.
The Assistant Commissioner of the Metropolitan Police, and head of the Criminal Investigation Department at the time of the murders was named Robert Anderson, he was the highest ranking officer to work on the cases. 
John Fitzgerald confessed to murder of Annie Chapman which was later proved untrue.

Series overview

Episode list

Series 1 (2009)
Guest starring;
Paul Hickey as David Cohen, a doctor at the local hospital.
Sally Leonard as Frances Coles, one of the intended murder victims.
Simon Tcherniak as George Phillips, Frances' boyfriend.
Branko Tomović as Antoni Pricha, one of the main suspects in the new Jack the Ripper case.
Sophie Stanton as Mary Bousefield, a police officer and victim of the new Ripper.
Jane Riley as Sarah Smith, a key witness in the enquiry.
Ben Loyd-Holmes as Private John Leary, the first suspect in the Ripper case.

Series one and two were broadcast as a single six-episode season on BBC America, and were subsequently released on DVD as such. For the BBC America DVD release, the two stories were given individual titles, with series one being entitled: The Walk of Terror (Parts 1–3) respectively.

Series 2 (2010)
Guest starring;
Peter Serafinowicz as DCI Cazenove, the corrupt Head of the Organised Crime Division.
Craig Parkinson as Jimmy and Johnny Kray, the heirs to the legacy of the original Kray twins.
Chrissie Cotterill as Angie Brooks, mother of the Kray twins.
Andrew Tiernan as Steven Dukes, a local gangster who helped the Krays rise to power.

Series one and two were broadcast as a single six-episode season on BBC America, and were subsequently released on DVD as such. For the BBC America DVD release, the two stories was given individual titles, with series two being entitled: The Legend Rising (Parts 1–3) respectively.

Series 3 (2012)
Whitechapel was commissioned for a third series in March 2011, but unlike the previous two series, which were each based on a single event, the new series was split into three separate two-part stories, which each focused on a different case. For the BBC America DVD releases, the three stories were given individual titles: The Murder in Darkness, The Hunger for Mercy and The Sins of Betrayal respectively.

Series 4 (2013)
Whitechapel was commissioned for a fourth series in October 2012, and follows the same format as the third series, featuring three individual cases. For the BBC America DVD releases, the last three stories were given the titles The Real Enemy, The Force of Injustice and To This End, respectively.

Production
The first series was written by Ben Court and Caroline Ip. ITV Director of Drama Laura Mackie said "Whitechapel is a very modern take on the detective genre which combines the Victorian intrigue of the original case with the atmospheric backdrop of a contemporary East End of London. This is not simply about bloodthirstily recreating the Ripper murders, but rather focusing on the three main characters at the heart of the story and the black humour that binds the team together."

Reception
Whitechapel debuted on 2 February 2009 at 9pm with 8.13 million viewers on the overnight ratings. Series one received positive reviews, and holds a Metacritic score of 75 out of 100, indicating "generally favourable" reviews.

A review in the Leicester Mercury said that it was "Life on Mars, without the time-travel" adding "what Whitechapel lacked in originality, it more than made up for with atmosphere and enthusiasm." After Episode 2 was broadcast on 9 February, Andrew Billen in The Times said that he had warmed to it more and more, adding, "slowly, the show is making Ripperologists of us all, as Jack's 'canonical' murders are separated from the ones he actually committed. It is all in the worst possible taste and bloody good fun." However, The Daily Telegraph was less impressed, writing "The premise was feeble, the script imbecilic, the acting on autopilot, the direction lacking in any glimmer of tension."

Series two received favourable reviews, and holds a Metacritic score of 69 out of 100, indicating "generally favourable" reviews.

References

External links

2009 British television series debuts
2013 British television series endings
2000s British police procedural television series
2010s British police procedural television series
British detective television series
British thriller television series
Obsessive–compulsive disorder in fiction
English-language television shows
ITV television dramas
Television shows set in London
Television series about Jack the Ripper
Whitechapel